Bartolomeo Frigerio (1585 – 13 November 1636) was a Roman Catholic prelate who served as Bishop of Venosa (1635–1636).

Biography
Bartolomeo Frigerio was born in Ferrara, Italy in 1585.

On 17 September 1635, he was appointed Bishop of Venosa by Pope Urban VIII. On 23 September 1635, he was consecrated bishop by Francesco Maria Brancaccio, Cardinal-Priest of Santi XII Apostoli, with Alessandro Suardi, Bishop of Lucera, and Sigismondo Taddei, Bishop of Bitetto, serving as co-consecrators.
 
He served as Bishop of Venosa until his death on 13 November 1636.

References

External links and additional sources
 (for Chronology of Bishops) 
 (for Chronology of Bishops) 

17th-century Italian Roman Catholic bishops
Bishops appointed by Pope Urban VIII
1585 births
1636 deaths